The basilica of San Vincenzo in Prato is a Roman Catholic church located in Via Daniele Crespi 6, in Milan, region of Lombardy, Italy. The church maintains most of its original Palaeo-Christian appearance.

History
The first church was founded by the Lombard king Desiderius in 770, who dedicated it to the Virgin Mary. Later it was entitled to St. Vincent, when the latter's relics were found in an urn in the crypt, together with those of St. Quirinus and St. Nicomedes (859) and St. Abundius. The name in Prato derives from its location in the "pratum" (in the field) area owned by bishop Odelpertus.

In 806 a Benedictine convent was added to the church; in the late years of the same century and in the early tenth century the deteriorating church was rebuilt, but with similar appearance. The octagonal baptistery on the exterior, on the left, was built by architect Paolo Mezzanotte in year 1932, and includes a column-shaped font called Pietra santa (the Saint Stone) coming from the ancient church of S. Nazaro in Pietra Santa, which was demolished in year 1889 during the construction of the new Via Dante.
The convent was suppressed in 1520 and in 1598 the church was restored and turned into a parish.

Architecture
The basilica measures c. 40 x 20 m, and is in brickwork. The interior is on a nave and two aisles with wooden spans ceiling. The columns are from different ages. The elevated choir ends with a large apse. Under the presbytery is the crypt, which has also a nave and two aisles divided by ten small columns with sculpted capitals.

San Vincenzo lies on the founding of a Roman temple or oratory built along the way to Vigevano probably dedicated to Jupiter, which was located within a Roman necropolis (of which some remains are visible in the external left walls of the church).

See also
 Early Christian churches in Milan

References

External links
Page on medieval art in Italy 
Milano - Battistero S.Vincenzo in Prato A short documentary about the Basilica from chiesadimilano.it site

Gallery

8th-century churches in Italy
900
Vincenzo al Prato
Palaeo-Christian architecture in Italy
8th-century establishments in Italy
Tourist attractions in Milan
10th-century churches in Italy
Churches completed in 770